The 1998–99 Villanova Wildcats men's basketball team represented Villanova University during the 1998–99 season. With an overall record 21–11 and conference record of 10–8, the Wildcats placed fifth in the Big East Conference, and after reaching the finals of the Big East tournament, the team was invited to the NCAA tournament as the No. 8 seed in the Midwest region.

Roster

Schedule and results

|-
!colspan=12 style=| Regular season

|-
!colspan=9 style="text-align: center; background:#"|Big East tournament

|-
!colspan=12 style=| NCAA tournament

Rankings

Team players in the 1999 NBA draft

References 

Villanova
Villanova Wildcats men's basketball seasons
Villanova
Villanova
Villanova